{{Infobox film
| name           = No Fathers in Kashmir
| image          = 
| caption        = 
| director       = Ashvin Kumar
| producer       = Ashvin Kumar
| screenplay     = Ashvin Kumar
| starring       = Zara WebbSoni RazdanShivam RainaAshvin KumarKulbhushan KharbandaAnshuman JhaNatasha Mago
| music          = Loïk DuryChristophe ‘Disco’ Minck
| cinematography = Jean-Marc Selva
| editing        = Thomas GoldserAshvin KumarAbhro Banerjee
| studio         = Alipur Films
| distributor    = 
| released       = {{Film date|df=yes|2019|4|05|ref1=<ref>{{Cite web|url=https://www.thequint.com/entertainment/indian-cinema/soni-razdans-no-fathers-in-kashmir-finally-gets-a-release-date|title=Soni Razdan's No Fathers in Kashmir 's' to Release on 5 April|website=The Quint|language=en|access-date=2019-03-14|date=14 March 2019}}</ref>}}
| runtime        = 
| country        = India
| language       = EnglishUrduKashmiri
| budget         = 
| gross          = 
}}No Fathers in Kashmir is an  Indian drama film directed by Ashvin Kumar. Written by Ashvin Kumar, the film stars Zara Webb, Ashvin Kumar, Kulbhushan Kharbanda, Anshuman Jha, Natasha Mago, Sandeep Verma. The film was released on 5 April 2019.

 Plot 

This is a coming-of-age film about friendship, hope and peace told through the innocent eyes of Noor (16), a smart-talking, selfie-obsessed British-Kashmiri teenager, who finds herself in a small village in Kashmir to meet her grandparents (Kulbhushan Kharbanda & Soni Razdan) who she has never met.

A tender and innocent friendship blossoms between her and a local village boy, Majid (16). She discovers that her dad and Majid's father were inseparable friends too, as young men. As an opaque story of that friendship unravels, so does Noor's curiosity about her father, as she stumbles on a series of long-held secrets.

Finally, she finds out that her father passed away under strange circumstances. What follows is a quest for answers in which a reluctant Majid finds himself taking her on a journey. They get lost in a dense jungle as they search for the last traces of their fathers without realising that the day has ended. As night falls, they light a bonfire, safe in the silent company of each other and fall asleep.

When they wake up, the teenagers are found by soldiers on patrol. Majid, initially safe from detection, could easily have escaped but he gives up his own safety to come to Noor's rescue. In a heartbreaking twist, Noor is soon released because she is a foreigner with a British passport but Majid is not. The question now is what, if anything, will Noor do to secure Majid's release?

 Cast 
 Zara Webb as Noor
 Shivam Raina as Majid
 Ashvin Kumar as Arshid
 Kulbhushan Kharbanda as Abdul Rashid
 Maya Sarao as Parvena
 Soni Razdan as Halima
 Anshuman Jha as Army major
 Natasha Mago as Zainab
 Sandeep Verma as Sikh Soldier

 Music 
The music of the film was composed by Loic Dury and Christophe (disco) Mink, two French composers who heard dozens of versions of the Cholhama Roshay song and decided to make it their inspiration.

The music of the film included instruments rarely heard in a sound track like the crystal bashe – an instrument that takes up an entire room to play. The composers never actually met Ali Safuddin. Nor did they ask him to re perform the title track in a studio. They took the same version as he recorded on YouTube sitting by the Dal Lake and added their own magic underneath. When Ali heard it for the first time at the screening of the film he was floored.

Release
 Censorship Issues 
An eight-month battle with the Central Board of Film Certification (CBFC) began in July 2018. After the first viewing that took place in October, CBFC passed the film with an 'A' certificate. The makers had then disagreed with the apex body and challenged their decision. They then went to the FCAT in November. Subsequently, two hearings were organised, one in December and another one in January.

All this while, support from the film fraternity did not slow down. Pritish Nandy and actress Swara Bhaskar lent support to the film. Also, expressing her disappointment in the matter, actress Alia Bhatt had written, “Was soo looking forward to mom's @nofathers_movie #nofathersinkashmir!! @Soni_Razdan @ashvinkumar & team worked super hard for this honest teens love story in Kashmir. Really hope the CBFC would #lifttheban. It’s a film about empathy & compassion... let’s give love a chance!” 

 Critical response No Fathers in Kashmir received glowing reviews from critics and audiences alike making it one of the best reviewed films of 2019.

Udita Jhunjhunwala wrote on Scroll.in that Ashvin Kumar offered a "sobering view of a situation that he seasons with hope". A powerful drama that terrifically encapsulates the robbed childhoods and broken dreams of Kashmiri adolescents, Kumar uses a British-Kashmiri teenage girl to propel his narrative that dwells deep into the darkest, most horrific corners of the valley, writes,  Ankur Pathak in Huffingtonpost.in

Utkarsh Mishra of Rediff.com gave 4.5 stars out of 5, writing, "can be watched again and again to understand each and every aspect of it". Samrudhi Ghosh of IndiaToday wrote, "No Fathers In Kashmir'' leaves you thinking of the thousands of disappeared fathers, sons and brothers long after you leave the theatre". Paulomi Das of Arre thinks that film is a tender portrait of first love in the time of the Kashmir crisis.

Saibal Chaterjee of NDTV  gave 3.5 stars out of 5 and commented, "the impact of the quality writing, the steady cinematography and the sharp editing is enhanced significantly by a cast of actors who strike the right notes all the way." Sreeparna Sengupta of Times of India rated it 3.5 stars out of 5. Suguna Sundaram of Cineblitz gave it 4 stars out of 5, applauded the performances and direction, and concluded "This simply told tale touches one deep inside, where it matters.

References

External links 

Kashmiri-language films
English-language Indian films
2019 films
2010s Hindi-language films
Kashmir conflict in films
2010s Urdu-language films